The Bandi river is a tributary of the Luni River in the Pali district of Rajasthan state in India.

Khari and Mithari river joins near the Bombadra pickup weir and form the Bandi river. After flowing for 45 KMs, it joins Luni river near Lakhar village, in Pali district.

The Hemawas dam is located near Hemawas is built on this river. The district headquarters Pali is located on the bank of Bandi river.

Its catchment area is about 1,685 km2 and situated in Pali district.

References

External links 
 Luni tributaries (Department of Irrigation, Government of Rajasthan)

Pali district
Rivers of Rajasthan
Rivers of India

de:Luni (Fluss in Rajasthan)
ml:ലൂണി നദി